The men's 500 metres races of the 2013–14 ISU Speed Skating World Cup 4, arranged in Sportforum Hohenschönhausen, in Berlin, Germany, were held on 6 and 8 December 2013.

Michel Mulder of the Netherlands won race one, while Mo Tae-bum of South Korea came second, and Keiichiro Nagashima of Japan came third. William Dutton of Canada won the Division B race.

In race two Mo advanced to the top of the podium, while Joji Kato of Japan took the silver medal, and race one winner Mulder took the bronze. Espen Aarnes Hvammen of Norway won the second Division B race.

Race 1
Race one took place on Friday, 6 December, with Division B scheduled in the morning session, at 10:44, and Division A scheduled in the afternoon session, at 14:50.

Division A

Division B

Race 2
Race two took place on Sunday, 8 December, with Division B scheduled in the morning session, at 09:10, and Division A scheduled in the afternoon session, at 13:50.

Division A

Division B

References

Men 0500
4